The following is a list of awards and nominations received by American rock musician Jerry Cantrell throughout his career.

American Music Awards
The American Music Awards is an annual awards ceremony created by Dick Clark in 1973.

|-
| style="text-align:center;"|  || Alice in Chains || Favorite New Heavy Metal/Hard Rock Artist || 
|-

Billboard Music Awards
The Billboard Music Awards is an annual awards ceremony held by Billboard magazine.

|-
| style="text-align:center;"| 1994 || "No Excuses" (Alice in Chains) || Top Rock Song ||

Billboard Music Video Awards

|-
| align="center" rowspan="2"| 1998 || rowspan="2"|Cut You In (Jerry Cantrell) || Best Hard Rock/Metal Clip || 
|-
| | Best New Hard Rock/Metal Artist Clip ||

Concrete Foundations Awards
The Concrete Foundations Awards was an awards ceremony held by the Foundations Forum to recognize the significant contributions made by key artists to the heavy metal genre and the music industry as a whole.

|-
| style="text-align:center;"| 1991 || Facelift (Alice in Chains) || Best Debut Album ||

Fryderyk Awards
The Fryderyk Awards is an annual awards ceremony held by the Polish Society of the Phonographic Industry.

|-
| style="text-align:center;"| 2010 || Black Gives Way to Blue (Alice in Chains) || Best Foreign Album ||

Grammy Awards
The Grammy Awards are awarded annually by the National Academy of Recording Arts and Sciences.

|-
| style="text-align:center;"| 1992 || "Man in the Box" (Alice in Chains) ||rowspan="2"|Best Hard Rock Performance With Vocal ||  
|-
| style="text-align:center;"| 1993 || Dirt (Alice in Chains) || 
|-
| style="text-align:center;"| 1995 || "I Stay Away" (Alice in Chains) ||rowspan="6"|Best Hard Rock Performance ||
|-
| style="text-align:center;"| 1996 || "Grind" (Alice in Chains) || 
|-
| style="text-align:center;"| 1997 || "Again" (Alice in Chains) || 
|-
| style="text-align:center;"| 2000 || "Get Born Again"  (Alice in Chains) || 
|-
| style="text-align:center;"| 2010 || "Check My Brain" (Alice in Chains) || 
|-
| style="text-align:center;"| 2011 || "A Looking in View" (Alice in Chains) || 
|-
| style="text-align:center;"| 2019 || Rainier Fog (Alice in Chains) || Best Rock Album ||

Kerrang! Awards
The Kerrang! Awards is an annual awards ceremony held by Kerrang!, a British rock magazine.

|-
| style="text-align:center;"| 1996 || Alice in Chains || Classic Songwriter Award || 
|-
| style="text-align:center;"| 2009 || Alice in Chains || Icon Award || 
|-

Loudwire Music Awards
The Loudwire Music Awards is an annual awards ceremony held by Loudwire, an American music website.

|-
| align="center" rowspan="5"| 2014 || Alice in Chains || Rock Band of the Year || 
|-
| | The Devil Put Dinosaurs Here|| Rock Album of the Year || 
|-
| | Jerry Cantrell || Guitarist of the Year || 
|-
| rowspan="2" | "Hollow" (Alice in Chains) || Rock Song of the Year || 
|-
| | Rock Video of the Year || 
|-

Metal Hammer Golden Gods Awards
The Metal Hammer Golden Gods Awards is an annual awards ceremony held by Metal Hammer, a British heavy metal magazine.

|-
| style="text-align:center;"| 2006 || Jerry Cantrell || Riff Lord Award || 
|-
| style="text-align:center;"| 2013 || Alice in Chains || Icon Award ||

Metal Storm Awards
The Metal Storm Awards is an annual awards held by Metal Storm, an Estonian heavy metal magazine.

|-
| align="center" rowspan="2"| 2009 || rowspan="2"|Black Gives Way to Blue (Alice in Chains) || Best Alternative Metal Album || 
|-
| Biggest Surprise || 
|-
| 2013 || The Devil Put Dinosaurs Here (Alice in Chains) || Best Alternative Metal Album  || 
|-
| 2018 || Rainier Fog (Alice in Chains) || Best Alternative Metal Album || 
|-

MoPOP's Founders Award
The MoPOP's Founders Award is an annual awards ceremony held by the Museum of Pop Culture in Seattle.

|-
|2020
|Alice in Chains
|Founders Award
|

MTV Movie Awards
The MTV Movie Awards is an annual awards ceremony established in 1992 by MTV.

|-
| style="text-align:center;"| 1993 || "Would?" from Singles || Best Song from a Movie || 
|-

MTV Video Music Awards
The MTV Video Music Awards is an annual awards ceremony established in 1984 by MTV.

|-
| style="text-align:center;"|  || "Man in the Box" || Best Heavy Metal/Hard Rock Video || 
|-
| style="text-align:center;"|  || "Would?" from Singles || Best Video from a Film || 
|-
| style="text-align:center;"|  || "Again" || Best Hard Rock Video || 
|-

MusiCares MAP Fund Awards
The Stevie Ray Vaughan Award is given annually by the MusiCares MAP Fund honoring musicians for their devotion to helping other addicts struggling with the recovery process.

|-
|2012
|Jerry Cantrell
|Stevie Ray Vaughan Award
|

Northwest Area Music Awards
The Northwest Area Music Awards (NAMA) was an awards ceremony held by the Northwest Area Music Association. Alice in Chains received nine nominations in 1991 and won one award. The other eight nominations are unknown.

|-
| style="text-align:center;"| 1991 || Facelift (Alice in Chains) || Best Recording || 
|-
| style="text-align:center;"| 1992 || Alice in Chains || Best Rock Group ||

Revolver Golden Gods Awards
The Revolver Golden Gods Awards is an annual awards ceremony held by Revolver, an American hard-rock and heavy metal magazine.

|-
| align="center" rowspan="2"| 2010 || Black Gives Way to Blue (Alice in Chains) || Album of the Year || 
|-
| | Alice in Chains || Comeback of the Year || 
|-
| align="center" rowspan="2"| 2014 || "Hollow" (Alice in Chains) || Song of the Year || 
|-
| | Jerry Cantrell || Dimebag Darrell Best Guitarist(s) Award ||

SPIN Magazine Readers' Poll
The SPIN Magazine Readers' Poll is an award held annually by American music magazine SPIN.

|-
| style="text-align:center;"| 1993 || Dirt (Alice in Chains) || Best Album ||

Total Guitar's Readers' Poll
The Total Guitar's Readers' Poll is an award held annually by British music magazine Total Guitar.

|-
| style="text-align:center;"| 2021 || Jerry Cantrell || Guitarist of the Year ||

Ultimate Guitar's Readers' Poll
The Ultimate Guitar's Readers' Poll is an award held annually by American music website Ultimate Guitar.

|-
| style="text-align:center;"| 2018 || Jerry Cantrell || Guitarist of the Year ||

References 

Awards
Cantrell, Jerry